The family Argulidae, whose members are commonly known as carp lice or fish lice, are parasitic crustaceans in the class Ichthyostraca. It is the only family in the monotypic subclass Branchiura and the order Arguloida, although a second family, Dipteropeltidae, has been proposed. Although they are thought to be primitive forms, they have no fossil record.

Taxonomy 

Branchiurans were once thought to be copepods but are now recognised as a separate subclass due to their distinct morphological characteristics. There are approximately 170 species in four genera recognised in the family Branchiura. The centres of diversity are the Afrotropical and Neotropical realms.

Description
Branchiurans have a flattened, oval body, which is almost entirely covered by a broad, oval carapace, four pairs of swimming legs, a pair of anterior compound eyes, and an unsegmented abdomen.

The mandibles are generally toothed hooks in Branchiurans. The maxillules provide sucking capability, and in the genera Argulus, Chonopeltis, and Dipteropeltis, the adults have a pair of suction cups that are from modified first maxillae. The genus Dolops, keeps the larval stages claw-like appendages into adulthood. It is still unknown whether the ancestral state of these organisms was to what suction discs or the hooked condition seen in Dolops, although it is thought that the specialized suctions discs are a later product of evolution. Also, females tend to be larger than the males. Between the genera there are multiple distinction between the sexes. For example, males in Argulus and Chonopeltis possess secondary sexual modifications on legs 2-4. The sexes both have their own sexual reproductive organs on their abdomens. The females have a spermathecae, while the males have a pair of testes.

Their compound eyes are prominent, and the mouthparts and the first pair of antennae are modified to form a hooked, spiny proboscis armed with suckers, as an adaptation to parasitic life. They have four pairs of thoracic appendages, which are used to swim when not attached to the host.

Distribution and habitat 
Branchiurans are widely distributed throughout the world. Most species are found in Africa and South America, and none are found in Antarctica. In North America, the genus Argulus is the only one known to be found in freshwater ecosystems.

Behaviour and ecology

Parasitism 
Branchiurans are ectoparasites that are found primarily on fish, but can also be found on other aquatic organisms such as invertebrates and amphibians. Branchiurans are obligate parasites.  Some species feed on the blood of their host, while others feed on mucus and extracellular material. Feeding is facilitated by distinct morphological adaptations (see Anatomy). Branchiura are able to attach to hosts through two mechanisms, hooked maxillae (as seen in Dolops) or suction disks. After engorging themselves, the parasites typically wait two to three weeks before feeding again. 
Mitigation of these parasites has been studied through the use of a treatment containing plant parts. From this study, it is thought that Tobacco leaf dust (containing nicotine) can safely and effectively eliminate adult Branchiurans from fish, although this may be specific to only Argulus bengalensis.

Reproduction 
Branchiurans leave their hosts for up to three weeks to mate and lay eggs, and reattach behind the fish's operculum, where they feed on mucus and sloughed-off scales, or pierce the skin and feed on the internal fluids. The eggs hatch into parasitic postnauplius larvae. While on their host, Branchiurans mate. The female holds the eggs in the thorax and in some species the eggs can be found inside the lobes of the carapace. The spermathecae on the female stores the sperm. In the genus Dolops, the males deposit a spermatophore onto the females. Once the eggs are fertilized the females leave the host organism to lay their eggs in rows on surfaces of plants, rocks, etc. Larvae are opportunistic in selecting host species of fish, and females are motile in their pursuit of locality of egg-laying.

Impact
Fish lice occasionally reach high enough densities to cause fish kills in aquaculture operations, or more rarely in wild populations of fish. They can also become abundant in aquaria, sometimes resulting in the death of ornamental fish.

References

External links

Crustacean families
Carboniferous first appearances
Arthropod subclasses